Hypodiscus is a group of plants in the Restionaceae named by Christian Gottfried Daniel Nees von Esenbeck and described as a genus in 1836.

The entire genus is endemic to  Cape Province in South Africa.

 Species

 Formerly included
species included at one time in Hypodiscus but now in other genera (Cannomois, Willdenowia)
 Hypodiscus dodii - Willdenowia humilis 
 Hypodiscus nitidus - Cannomois nitida

References

External links
 photo of herbarium specimen at Missouri Botanical Garden, Hypodiscus aristatus

Restionaceae
Endemic flora of South Africa
Flora of the Cape Provinces
Fynbos
Poales genera
Taxa named by Christian Gottfried Daniel Nees von Esenbeck